Andrey Nikitin may refer to:
Andrey Nikitin (footballer, born 1980), Russian association football player
Andrey Nikitin (footballer, born 2000), Russian association football player
Andrey Nikitin (general) (1891–1957), Soviet officer
Andrey Nikitin (politician) (born 1979), acting Governor of Novgorod Oblast, Russia